Mark Powell (born in London, November 13, 1960) is an independent British fashion designer described as 'a giant of British tailoring'. His name has been synonymous with creative cutting since the 1980s. Mark Powell is known for his highly detailed, complex biro drawings.

Powell, who operates from a retail base in Newburgh Street in central London’s Soho, combines bespoke, made-to-measure, and ready-to-wear tailoring with a keen sense of fashion history and mix of references from the Edwardian era to the present day. 

This has led to recognition of Powell’s role as a major contributor to the resuscitation of "great British bespoke", and attracted an international clientele including actors Martin Freeman,  Daniel Radcliffe, Jude Law and George Clooney, rock stars and style icons such as David Bowie, Bryan Ferry, Mick Jagger, George Michael, and Paul Weller, sports personality Bradley Wiggins, supermodel Naomi Campbell and the late British DJ/producer Andrew Weatherall.

Though Powell's clothes have been associated with so-called “gangster chic” 
and the slimmer silhouettes of the 1960s Mod movement, he says evaluation of his output shows that he is diverse and experimental in his design work. ‘My clothing is inspired by the past but I always make sure it looks contemporary,’ said Powell. ‘I’ve done some pretty avant-garde stuff with women’s wear and tailoring generally.’

Early life

Powell was raised in London's East End and Romford, Essex. His father worked in textiles, while his mother worked for the central London theatrical costumier Charles Fox. In his teens, Powell showed an early interest in style by having 1940s and 1950s style clothing made for himself by local tailors and learned about measure and cut in the late 1970s as an employee of Mayfair men's outfitter Washington Tremlett.

Powell & Co

Subsequently, Powell worked at retro menswear retailer Robot, where he introduced a bespoke service while managing the company’s outlet in Covent Garden’s Floral Street, and in 1985 opened his first shop in Soho's Archer Street with partner Nick Tentis. Powell & Co initially sold unworn suits from the 1940s, 1950s and 1960s and then incorporated a tailoring business. Among the early customers was David Bowie. 

Powell's suits, separates and accessories recalled the sharply-dressed East End characters of his childhood and comprised the first manifestation of gangster chic; among Powell's clients were the incarcerated Krays.

Soho studios
Following the closure of Powell & Co, Powell operated from an atelier in Soho’s D'Arblay Street and developed a customer base that included the influential stylist Isabella Blow, who recommended Powell to Bryan Ferry. The Roxy Music singer wore bespoke Powell designs on the sleeve of his 1995 compilation More Than This. 

British comedian Vic Reeves sported Powell's neo-Edwardian suits for his appearances on such hit television shows as Big Night Out and Shooting Stars and George Michael wore a Mark Powell tartan suit for his performance at The Freddie Mercury Tribute Concert.

Around this time Powell was identified as being at the forefront of the UK’s new breed of contemporary tailors, which included Timothy Everest, Richard James, and Ozwald Boateng; in fact Boateng modeled for Powell when he presented his 1991 collection in Russia.

Powell's suits were also worn by Mel B of the Spice Girls, for the group's meeting with Prince Charles in 1997, Bianca Jagger, Naomi Campbell, notably for her court appearances, and Keira Knightley.

Powell also dressed and styled George Clooney and Harrison Ford when they appeared respectively as Thomas Jefferson and Abraham Lincoln on the covers of issues of John F. Kennedy’s George magazine. 

In 2000 Powell took over a studio in Brewer Street where visitors for fittings included DJ/producer Goldie, the Earl Of Stockton Daniel MacMillan and singer-songwriter Kevin Rowland, who commissioned Powell outfits for the reunion of his group Dexys Midnight Runners. 

Daniel Radcliffe wore Mark Powell suits for three of the London premieres of the Harry Potter movies  and British folk singer Billy Bragg commissioned a Pearly King-style suit from Powell for stagewear for his 2007 UK tour.

Noted for his "attention to detail" Powell produced a series of collections for Marks & Spencer’s Autograph range,collaborated with fashion brands including Mulberry and Michiko Koshino and made regular appearances at international menswear show Pitti Uomo.

Catwalk shows
Over the years Powell has organised fashion catwalk shows to coincide with London Fashion Week, notably at Savile Row restaurant Sartoria in 2001 and 2002.

2 Marshall Street

In June 2010 Powell opened the outlet Mark Powell Bespoke in Soho’s Marshall Street. 

Here Powell’s customer base expanded to include Bradley Wiggins, who revealed during his 2015 appearance on the BBC Radio 4’s Desert Island Discs that he discussed acceptance of the knighthood awarded to him by The Queen with Paul Weller while they were both fitted for suits by Powell at the address.

10 Newburgh Street
Powell shifted his business to larger premises in the regenerated Carnaby area of Soho in spring 2020, by which time he had adopted new digital and social media strategies, as reported by Joshua Bluteau’s 2021 book Dressing Up.

These include two dedicated Instagram accounts which served to increase engagement with customers during the Coronavirus pandemic.

In 2022 collaborations include an exclusive footwear range with the British brand Tricker's while Powell has introduced a more casual tailored range based on separates in corduroy and linen influenced by classic Continental and French Riviera styles. 

One suit is called ‘The Vince’, a tribute to Vince Man’s Shop, which was established as Britain’s first male boutique in adjacent premises in Newburgh Street in the 1950s.

Film and television

Powell’s clothing was featured in Julien Temple’s 1986 film Absolute Beginners, and also appeared in other movie productions such as 1994’s Shopping and 2000’s Gangster No. 1.

Powell was the focus of the BBC2 documentary series Soho Stories, directed by Chris Terrill in 1996 and appeared as a judge and mentor in the 2012 BBC3 series Young Tailor of the Year.

Books and exhibitions

Powell has participated in several Department of Trade & Industry-organised international fashion shows, and staged four of his own during London Fashion Weeks.

A three-piece Powell suit is in the Victoria & Albert Museum's permanent collection and was featured in the museum's 1997 exhibition The Cutting Edge: Post War Fashion.

Powell also contributed garments to the British Fashion Council's 21st Century Dandy exhibition of 2003 and appeared in the accompanying book. Other books featuring Powell’s tailoring include Paul Gorman’s The Look and Sharp Suits by Eric Musgrave.

External links
 http://markpowellbespoke.co.uk
 https://www.instagram.com/markpowellbespoke/
 https://www.instagram.com/markpowellarchives/
 https://en-gb.facebook.com/markpowellbespoke/

Notes

British fashion designers
1960 births
Living people